The 2020–21 Pittsburgh Panthers women's basketball team represented The University of Pittsburgh during the 2020–21 NCAA Division I women's basketball season. The Panthers, were led by third year head coach Lance White, and played their home games at the Petersen Events Center as members of the Atlantic Coast Conference.

The Panthers finished the season 5–14 and 3–12 in ACC play to finish in twelfth place.  In the ACC tournament, they lost to Boston College in the First Round.  They were not invited to the NCAA tournament or the WNIT.

Previous season
They finished the season 5–26 and 1–17 in ACC play to finish in fifteenth place.  As the fifteenth seed in the ACC tournament, they defeated Notre Dame in the First Round before losing to Georgia Tech in the Second Round.  The NCAA tournament and WNIT were cancelled due to the COVID-19 outbreak.

Off-season

Departures

Incoming transfers

Recruiting Class

Source:

Roster

Schedule

Source:

|-
!colspan=9 style=| Non-Conference Regular season

|-
!colspan=9 style=| ACC Regular season

|-
!colspan=9 style=| ACC Women's Tournament

Rankings

Coaches did not release a Week 2 poll and AP does not release a poll after the NCAA tournament.

References

Pittsburgh Panthers women's basketball seasons
Pittsburgh
Pittsburgh
Pittsburgh